Megan Williams may refer to:

 Megan Williams case, Megan Williams, American woman who falsely accused six people of kidnapping, torture, and rape
 Megan Williams (actress) (1956–2000), Australian actress and singer
 Megan Williams (artist) (born 1956), American contemporary artist
 Megan Williams (author) (born 1984), Canadian author
 Megan Williams-Stewart (born 1987), American figure skater